The Delavan Post Office is located in Delavan, Wisconsin. It was added to the National Register of Historic Places in 2000.

It is located on Delavan's Vitrified Brick Street.

It is a two-story building which has six brick pilasters with Tuscan capitals dividing its front facade into five bays, overlooking wide granite steps.  It has a carved, stone architrave wrapping around the building, beneath a brick frieze and denticulated cornice.

Its interior includes a mural painted in 1984 by Rosemary Roth showing scenes from Delavan's history.

References

Buildings and structures in Walworth County, Wisconsin
Post office buildings on the National Register of Historic Places in Wisconsin
Neoclassical architecture in Wisconsin
Government buildings completed in 1914
1914 establishments in Wisconsin
National Register of Historic Places in Walworth County, Wisconsin
Delavan, Wisconsin